Sangasanga is a coastal subdistrict of East Kalimantan in Indonesia.

Sangasanga  has an area of 233.4 km², and is divided into five smaller areas. The subdistrict's population was 11,855 inhabitants in 2005. This district is an important oil-producing area.

References

Kutai Kartanegara Regency
Districts of East Kalimantan